Events from the year 1155 in Ireland.

Incumbents
High King: Toirdelbach Ua Conchobair

Events
Pope Adrian IV issues the papal bull Laudabiliter, granting Henry II of England the right to rule Ireland, after Henry convinced the Pope that he was needed "to proclaim the truths of the Christian religion" to the Irish people.

References